Protein NipSnap homolog 2 is a protein that in humans is encoded by the GBAS gene.

Chromosomal region 7p12, which contains GBAS, is amplified in approximately 40% of glioblastomas, the most common and malignant form of central nervous system tumor. The predicted 286-amino acid protein contains a signal peptide, a transmembrane domain, and 2 tyrosine phosphorylation sites. The GBAS transcript is expressed most abundantly in heart and skeletal muscle. GBAS protein might be involved in vesicular transport.

References

Further reading